

The Partenavia P.86 Mosquito was a two-seat civil trainer aircraft first flown in Italy on 27 April 1986. It was a high-wing monoplane of pod-and-boom construction with tricycle undercarriage and a twin tail, that accommodated the student and instructor side-by-side.

In 1988, Partenavia created the Aviolight company as a joint venture with two other partners in order to produce the aircraft, with an initial series of 100 aircraft to be powered by a 56 kW (75 hp) Limbach L2000, with modifications to allow certification. Nothing came of it, and the prototype was the only example produced. Partenavia itself was declared bankrupt the same year.

Specifications

See also

Notes

References

External links

 luftfahrt-archiv.de

Mosquito
1980s Italian civil trainer aircraft
High-wing aircraft
Aircraft first flown in 1986